Richard I. Bong Airport  is a city-owned public-use airport located three nautical miles (6 km) south of the central business district of Superior, a city in Douglas County, Wisconsin, United States. It is included in the Federal Aviation Administration (FAA) National Plan of Integrated Airport Systems for 2021–2025, in which it is categorized as a local general aviation facility.

Also known as Richard I. Bong Memorial Airport, it is named after World War II fighter pilot Richard I. Bong, the highest scoring U.S. fighter ace in history.

Facilities and aircraft 
Richard I. Bong Airport covers an area of 654 acres (265 ha) at an elevation of 674 feet (205 m) above mean sea level. It has two asphalt paved runways: 4/22 is 5,100 by 75 feet (1,554 x 23 m) and 14/32 is 4,001 by 75 feet (1,220 x 23 m), all with approved GPS approaches.

For the 12-month period ending August 24, 2022, the airport had 19,250 aircraft operations, an average of 53 per day: 96% general aviation, 4% air taxi and less than 1% military. In January 2023, there were 46 aircraft based at this airport: 40 single-engine and 6 multi-engine.

The BONG (SUW) non-directional beacon, 260 kHz, is located on field.

See also 
 List of airports in Wisconsin

References

External links 
 Richard I. Bong Memorial Airport at City of Superior website
  at Wisconsin DOT airport directory
 Superior Flying Services, the fixed-base operator (FBO)
 

Airports in Wisconsin
Buildings and structures in Douglas County, Wisconsin
Superior, Wisconsin